The Far North is a large region of South Australia close to the Northern Territory border. Colloquial usage of the term in South Australia refers to that part of South Australia north of a line roughly from Ceduna through Port Augusta to Broken Hill. The South Australian Government defines the Far North region similarly with the exception of the Maralinga Tjarutja Lands, the Yalata Aboriginal community and other unincorporated crown lands in the state's far west, which are officially considered part of the Eyre and Western region.

The region is both the largest and also the least populated of the state. The Far North is also known as the Arid Lands of South Australia as much of the region is desert.

Deserts
 

The deserts in the north east are the Simpson Desert, Tirari Desert, Painted Desert and the Pedirka Desert. To the north and north west the Great Victoria Desert predominates the landscape.

Governance
The Far North includes the following local government areas: Anangu Pitjantjatjara Yankunytjatjara (APY), City of Port Augusta, District Council of Coober Pedy, Flinders Ranges Council and Municipal Council of Roxby Downs. As most of its extent lies within what is known as the unincorporated area, municipal services to communities outside of the above listed local government areas are provided directly by the South Australian Government via the Outback Communities Authority. It is within the extent of the state electoral districts of Giles and Stuart, and the Federal Division of Grey.

Tourism
The region has scattered tourist attractions and facilities as well as national parks and reserves.

Permits are required to enter Aboriginal-owned land, the Woomera Prohibited Area and several National Parks in the region, including Kati Thanda-Lake Eyre National Park and Witjira National Park.

Some significant roads in the area include the Stuart Highway from Port Augusta to Alice Springs, the Oodnadatta Track, and both the Birdsville Track and the Strzelecki Track to Queensland.

See also

 Regions of South Australia
 List of regions of Australia

Notes

References

External links
Regional Development Australia Far North

Regions of South Australia